The Type 364 radar was developed by the Yangzhou Marine Electronic Instruments Research Institute (扬州船用电子仪器研究所) / No. 723 Research Institute. It is typically enclosed in a dome on new PLA-N's frigates and destroyers.

An improved version of the earlier Type 360, it replaces the Yagi IFF antenna with a planar IFF configuration and moves to higher frequencies in order to achieve better target discrimination. The dome is also expected to improve azimuth resolution. 

It is expected to be used primarily for CIWS (Type 730, Type 630, HQ-10) targeting with secondary air search and SSM targeting abilities.

It is offered for sale through the China Shipbuilding Industry Corporation (CSIC).


Specifications

System: Coherent pulse compression (CPC), adaptive moving target detector (AMTD)
 Band: S band
 Range: 75km against 2 square meter RCS aircraft; 12km against 0.1 square meter RCS target
 Beam width: 2°(H), 25° (V)
 Scan coverage: 360°×25°
 Processing capacity
 Multiple tracking: ≥20pcs
 Antenna
Mast weight: 520 kg
Type: Incision parabolic antenna
Gain: 38dB
Rotation speed: 30RPM
 Transmitter / Receiver
 Frequency: S-band
 Consumption: 100w (avg.) 60kW (peak)
 NF: <3dB
 Friend/Foe Transponder
 Gain: 20dB
 Beam width: 1°×30°
 Ambient temperature
 Antenna: -25℃~+70℃
 Power supply
 AC: 220VAC (150~250 VAC)
 Power consumption: 10kW

See also
 Type 054  Ma'anshan class frigate
 Type 052B Guangzhou-class
 Type 052C Lanzhou-class
 Type 051C Luzhou-class

External links
CPC Low Airspace Target Detection And Surveillance Radar System For Fire Control System
China Shipbuilding Industry Corporation 
Yangzhou Marine Electronic Instruments Research Institute 

Naval radars
Military radars of the People's Republic of China